Hallmark University is an institution of higher learning situated in Ijebu-Itele, Ogun State, Nigeria.

References

Universities and colleges in Nigeria